Anastasios "Tasos" Antonakis (alternate spelling: Tassos) (born February 9, 1992, in Athens, Greece) is a Greek professional basketball player who last played for Apollon Patras of the Greek A2 Basket League. He is 2.05 m (6 ft 8  in) tall, and he plays at the power forward and center positions.

Professional career
Antonakis began his professional career in the Greek League with AEK Athens in 2008. He then moved to the Greek Second Division club Pagrati in 2011. He joined Ilysiakos in 2012.

He also played with the Greek clubs Apollon Patras, Ethnikos Piraeus, and Koroivos Amaliadas, before joining Charilaos Trikoupis, in 2018.

National team career
With the junior national teams of Greece, Antonakis played at the following tournaments: the 2008 FIBA Europe Under-16 Championship, the 2009 FIBA Europe Under-18 Championship, the 2010 FIBA Europe Under-18 Championship, the 2011 FIBA Europe Under-20 Championship, and the 2012 FIBA Europe Under-20 Championship.

He was the high scorer for the junior team of Greece, with 13 points in their final game at the 2010 FIBA Europe Under-18 Championship.

References

External links
FIBA Profile
FIBA Europe Profile
Eurobasket.com Profile
Greek Basket League Profile 
Draftexpress.com Profile
AEK Profile

1992 births
Living people
AEK B.C. players
Apollon Patras B.C. players
Centers (basketball)
Charilaos Trikoupis B.C. players
Ethnikos Piraeus B.C. players
Greek men's basketball players
Ilysiakos B.C. players
Koroivos B.C. players
Pagrati B.C. players
Power forwards (basketball)
Basketball players from Athens